José Adolfo Alvarado Lara (born May 15, 1945) is a Honduran politician. A member of the National Party of Honduras, he represents the Copan Department and is a deputy of the National Congress of Honduras for 2006–2010.

External links
Profile

Deputies of the National Congress of Honduras
1945 births
Living people
National Party of Honduras politicians
People from Copán Department